François Decrombecque (4 December 1884 – 7 August 1960) was a French racewalker. He competed in the men's 10 kilometres walk at the 1924 Summer Olympics.

References

External links
 

1884 births
1960 deaths
Athletes (track and field) at the 1924 Summer Olympics
French male racewalkers
Olympic athletes of France
Place of birth missing